Mari Leivis Sánchez Periñán (born 8 October 1991) is a Colombian weightlifter. She is a two-time silver medalist in the women's 71kg event at the Pan American Weightlifting Championships. She won two medals, including gold, at the 2022 Bolivarian Games held in Valledupar, Colombia.

Career 

She won the gold medal in the women's 69kg Snatch event at the 2018 Central American and Caribbean Games held in Barranquilla, Colombia. She also won the silver medal in the women's 69kg Clean & Jerk event. In that same year, she competed in the women's 71kg event at the World Weightlifting Championships held in Ashgabat, Turkmenistan.

She won the silver medal in her event at the 2020 Pan American Weightlifting Championships held in Santo Domingo, Dominican Republic. She also won the silver medal in her event at the 2022 Pan American Weightlifting Championships held in Bogotá, Colombia.

She won two medals, including gold, at the 2022 Bolivarian Games held in Valledupar, Colombia. She won the silver medal in the women's 76kg event at the 2022 South American Games held in Asunción, Paraguay.

Achievements

References

External links 
 

Living people
1991 births
Place of birth missing (living people)
Colombian female weightlifters
Pan American Weightlifting Championships medalists
Central American and Caribbean Games medalists in weightlifting
Central American and Caribbean Games gold medalists for Colombia
Central American and Caribbean Games bronze medalists for Colombia
Competitors at the 2018 Central American and Caribbean Games
South American Games silver medalists for Colombia
South American Games medalists in weightlifting
Competitors at the 2022 South American Games
21st-century Colombian women